Air Orient was an airline based in France. Created in 1929 from the merger of Air Asie (c. 1928) and Air Union Lignes d’Orient (c. 1927 – renamed from Messageries Transaeriennes 1923), the short lived airline was merged with Air France October 7, 1933.

Destinations

The airline connected France and parts of Europe to the Middle East and Far East, many of which were French colonial outposts:

 France – Paris, Lyon, Marseille
 Great Britain – London
 Italy – Naples
 Greece – Corfu, Athens
 Lebanon – Beirut
 Syria – Damascus, Aleppo
 Iraq – Baghdad
 Persia – Bushehr (Bouchir), Jask (Djask)
 India – Allahabad, Karachi, Jodhpur, Calcutta
 Siam – Bangkok
 Burma – Rangoon, Akyab
 Indochina – Saigon

Fleet

 Chantiers Aéro-Maritimes de la Seine CAMS 53 seaplanes - 2
 SPCA Météore 63 – 3 from Air Union Lignes d’Orient
 Farman F.190

See also

Recently the Ukraine-based Air Charter Asia airline changed its name to Air Orient.

Code data
IATA Code: UT
ICAO Code: ORT
Callsign: Air Orient

References

External links

Defunct airlines of France
Airlines established in 1929
Airlines disestablished in 1933
1929 establishments in France
Defunct seaplane operators